Constantine Kastrioti may refer to:

Kostandin Kastrioti (d. 1390), great-grandfather of Gjergj Kastrioti Skanderbeg
Kostandin Kastrioti, son of Pal Kastrioti
Kostandin Kastrioti, brother of Skanderbeg
Costantino Castriota (d. 1500), Bishop of Isernia, son of Gjon Kastrioti II
Costantino Castriota, knight of the Order of Malta, son of Alfonso Granai-Castriota
Fabio Constantino Castriota (1574 - 1615), son of Pardo Castriota
Constantino Alessandro Castriota (1616 - 1643)